Werner Birnbaum (born 9 August 1963) is an Australian gymnast. He competed in seven events at the 1984 Summer Olympics.

References

1963 births
Living people
Australian male artistic gymnasts
Olympic gymnasts of Australia
Gymnasts at the 1984 Summer Olympics
Place of birth missing (living people)